The thirty-eighth edition of the Caribbean Series (Serie del Caribe) was held from February 3 through February 8 of  with the champion baseball teams of the Dominican Republic, Águilas Cibaeñas; Mexico, Tomateros de Culiacán; Puerto Rico, Lobos de Arecibo, and Venezuela, Navegantes del Magallanes. The format consisted of 12 games, each team facing the other teams twice, and the games were played at Estadio Quisqueya in Santo Domingo, Dominican Republic.

Summary

Final standings

Individual leaders

All-Star team

Sources
Nuñez, José Antero (1994). Serie del Caribe de la Habana a Puerto La Cruz. JAN Editor.

External links
Estadísticas Serie del Caribe 1994 (Spanish)

Caribbean
1996
International baseball competitions hosted by the Dominican Republic
1996 in Dominican Republic sport
1996 in Caribbean sport
Caribbean Series
20th century in Santo Domingo